Arjun Kapoor (born 26 June 1985) is an Indian actor working in Hindi films. Born to the Surinder Kapoor family, he is the son of film producer Boney Kapoor and Mona Shourie. Kapoor made his acting debut in 2012 with the drama Ishaqzaade which was commercially successful and earned him several awards, including the Stardust Award for Superstar of Tomorrow – Male. He had further commercial successes in the 2014 films Gunday and 2 States. This was followed by a series of box-office flops in his career, with the exception of the romantic drama Ki & Ka (2016).

Early life and family 
Arjun Kapoor was born in a Punjabi family. on 26 June 1985 in Mumbai, Maharashtra, to film producer Boney Kapoor and the entrepreneur Mona Shourie Kapoor. He is the grandson of filmmaker Surinder Kapoor. He is the nephew of actors Anil Kapoor, Sanjay Kapoor and producer Sandeep Marwah, and the first-cousin of actress Sonam Kapoor, actors Mohit Marwah, Harshvardhan Kapoor and producer Rhea Kapoor. He has a younger sister, Anshula Kapoor. Actress Sridevi was his stepmother, and he also has two half-sisters, Khushi and Janhvi Kapoor. He was 11 when his father separated from his mother.

When asked in an interview about his father's second marriage, Kapoor said: "When we were kids, it was difficult. But what can you do? How long will you complain? You have to accept what is, take it on your chin, and move on." He added, "We don't really meet and spend time together so it doesn't really exist". His mother died in 2012. However, after Sridevi died  in 2018, his relationship with his half-sisters Khushi and Jahnvi improved. Kapoor also opened up on the bullying he faced post Boney's marriage with Sridevi. His maternal grandmother, Sattee Shourie, who was a great support to him, also died in 2016.

Kapoor was educated at the Arya Vidya Mandir school in Mumbai, which he attended until his 11th grade. After failing his eleventh grade examinations, he quit his studies.He didn’t even complete grade 12.  In his teens and early twenties, Kapoor developed obesity and approximately weighed 140 kg; he later said that due to his condition, he used to be "sloppy, grumpy" and "under-confident".

Career

2003–14: Early work, acting debut and breakthrough 

Kapoor's first job in the film industry was as an assistant director on Nikhil Advani's Kal Ho Naa Ho in 2003. He also assisted Advani on his next directorial Salaam-e-Ishq: A Tribute to Love (2007), and worked as an associate producer on two of his father's productionsNo Entry (2005) and Wanted (2009). Kapoor was then signed on for a three-film contract with Yash Raj Films, a leading production company in India.

In 2011, it was announced that Kapoor will debut with a film named Virus Diwan, produced under Yash Raj Films, which was shelved after sometime. Later, he signed on to debut with the company's romantic drama Ishaqzaade (2012) alongside Parineeti Chopra, which tells the love story between a son and daughter of a Hindu and Muslim political family, respectively. While filming a running sequence for the feature in Barabanki, Kapoor suffered a spasm in his hamstring muscle, though he finished the scene after resting for five minutes. Ishaqzaade became a profitable venture, earning  worldwide, and his performance was praised, winning Kapoor a Zee Cine Award for Best Male Debut.

Yash Raj Films' next project to star Kapoor was the action thriller Aurangzeb (2013) whose title matches the name of a Mughal emperor of the same name. Marking the directorial debut of Atul Sabharwal, it co-starred Jackie Shroff, Rishi Kapoor and Amrita Singh; he portrayed two estranged twin brothers, Ajay and Vishal, who end up in each other's places as part of a huge conspiracy to overthrow their biological father's empire. Critic Rachna Saltz from The New York Times said of Kapoor that he is a "star of an earlier generation" and is "well-cast and matched". However, the film underperformed at the box office.

For his first film in 2014, Kapoor teamed with Yash Raj Films for the third consecutive time on Gunday, a crime action film also starring Ranveer Singh and Priyanka Chopra. Directed by Ali Abbas Zafar, it saw him and Singh portray two bandits with bold attitude, in love with a dancer (Chopra). He described his character as "temperamental" who acts as a "moment's heat". Film analyst Anupama Chopra mentioned the film as an "unabashed love letter to the 1970s". Gunday proved to be a commercial success, and accumulated over  worldwide.

As his three-film deal with Yash Raj Films concluded, Kapoor next collaborated with the producers Sajid Nadiadwala and Karan Johar to star opposite Alia Bhatt in a film adaptation of Chetan Bhagat's popular novel 2 States, released with the same title. He played Krish Malhotra, an IIM Ahmedabad MBA student wanting to become a writer. Saurabh Dwivedi stated that Kapoor "shows his pain through body language but falls short in some scenes opposite his co-actor Ronit Roy". The project was well appreciated, garnering critical acclaim, and earned more than  Worldwide  to emerge as his biggest commercial success so far. He received an IIFA Award for Best Actor nomination. His last release of 2014 was the Homi Adajania's adventurous satire Finding Fanny, which co—starred Deepika Padukone, Naseeruddin Shah, Dimple Kapadia and Pankaj Kapur and the movie follows the lives of five dysfunctional people in search of a titular woman.

2015–present: Career decline 

In 2015, Kapoor featured in his father's second younger brother Sanjay's first production Tevar, a remake of the Telugu film Okkadu (2003), in which he co-starred alongside Sonakshi Sinha and Manoj Bajpayee as a Kabaddi player. He was director Amit Sharma's only choice to play the role. Upon release, the film was poorly received and failed both critically and commercially.

The following year, Kapoor served as the host for the seventh season of Colors TV's reality stunts-performing series Fear Factor: Khatron Ke Khiladi. In the same year, he starred opposite Kareena Kapoor Khan in R. Balki's satirical comedy-drama Ki & Ka, based on the content of gender stereotypes. Kapoor portrayed the male lead Kabir Bansal, a stay-at-home husband. Writing for India Today, Ananya Bhattacharya gave the film a negative review and wrote that Kapoor"looks like a mouthing sharp". Nonetheless, the film was a modest critical success and became a commercial success grossing ₹1.03 billion.

The Mohit Suri-directed, teen romantic drama Half Girlfriend became Kapoor's first film of 2017, which served as a retelling of Bhagat's novel of the same name. He was cast in the role of Madhav Jha, a basketball champion who hardly speaks English and ends up getting attracted towards a college girl (played by Shraddha Kapoor) when he joins a college. In an interview, Kapoor admitted that he signed the film despite not reading the novel. The film was a critical and commercial failure.

Later that year, Kapoor played twin brothers for the second time in Mubarakan, a comedy directed by Anees Bazmee, in which he starred alongside his uncle Anil Kapoor. The film also featured Ileana D'Cruz and Athiya Shetty as the love interests of his characters. In her review, Saibal Chatterjee wrote that Kapoor "demonstrates a comic flair that is crying out for a better film".

In 2018, Kapoor starred in a spin-off to the romantic comedy Namastey London (2007), named Namaste England, helmed by Vipul Amrutlal Shah. He played a character that falls in love with an aspiring jewelry designer played by Parineeti Chopra, reuniting with the actress after Ishaqzaade. The film proved to be a major box office flop, and Saibal Chatterjee of NDTV concluded his scathing review of the film with a note stating, "Seriously, one more film of this quality and the careers of Arjun Kapoor and Parineeti Chopra could be in grave jeopardy. Hopefully, these two young actors know better".

2019 was yet another disappointing year in Kapoor's career, as the two films he starred in were commercial failures again. In his first release, the crime drama India's Most Wanted directed by Raj Kumar Gupta, he essayed the role of an agent who is given a secret mission of tracking a terrorist. His next screen appearance occurred in Ashutosh Gowarikar's period drama Panipat alongside Sanjay Dutt and Kriti Sanon. Based on the 3rd Panipat battle, it featured him as Maratha emperor Sadashiv Rao Bhau and depicted how Bhau fought the battle against the Afghan warrior Ahmed Shah Abdali.

In 2021, Kapoor starred in Sandeep Aur Pinky Faraar, which is his third screen sharing with Parineeti Chopra, was released on 19 March and it failed to do well at the box office.  Kapoor also starred in Kaashvie Nair's Sardar Ka Grandson in which he is paired opposite Rakul Preet Singh. He is also starred in the horror comedy film Bhoot Police co-starring Saif Ali Khan, Jacqueline Fernandez & Yami Gautam. Both of his movies were released on Netflix and Disney+ Hotstar.

In 2022, Kapoor starred in Mohit Suri's Ek Villain Returns with John Abraham, Disha Patani and Tara Sutaria, it was a moderately at the box office.

In 2023, Kapoor starred in Aasmaan Bharadwaj's directorial debut Kuttey alongside Tabu, Radhika Madan and Naseeruddin Shah was released on 13 January, it was a major commercial failure for Kapoor.

As of January 2023, Kapoor will be seen in The Lady Killer, remake of Meri Patni Ka, a Hindi remake of Tamil film Comali and Siddharth Anand's action thriller Maut alongside Amrita Puri and Manoj Bajpayee which is a under of Yash Raj Films banner and produced by Aditya Chopra.

Personal life and off-screen works
Kapoor was in a relationship with Arpita Khan, Salman Khan's sister, before he became an actor. 
He began a relationship with Sonakshi Sinha, his co-star in Tevar, in 2014, but they broke up a year later.
Since 2016, he has been dating Malaika Arora.

Kapoor is a keen football fan and an avid supporter of Chelsea F.C. while also being the club's brand ambassador for India. Kapoor is a endorser for various brands and products, and was the co-owner of the ISL team FC Pune City before it was dissolved in 2019 due to financial and technical difficulties. Philips also roped him as their brand ambassador. He was also a brand ambassador for Flying Machine and Royal Stag along with Ranveer Singh as well as Hero Cycles. , he also endorses Smith & Jones ketchup, condiments and sauces, and Admiral England Sportswear & Sportshoes.

Kapoor co-hosted the IIFA Awards ceremony in 2015 with Singh. He has also hosted the seventh season of the reality TV series Fear Factor: Khatron Ke Khiladi 7.

Filmography

Films

Television

Music videos

Awards and nominations

References 

″Arbaaz Khan and Arjun Kapoor will seen in the television series based on the life of Malaika Arora″
Showbez.com 22 September 2022

External links 

 
 

1985 births
Living people
Indian male film actors
Male actors in Hindi cinema
Male actors from Mumbai
Punjabi people
Zee Cine Awards winners